Joke van Rijswijk (born 1954) is a Dutch Paralympic athlete. She represented the Netherlands in athletics at the 1980 Summer Paralympics, at the 1984 Summer Paralympics and at the 1988 Summer Paralympics. In total, she won three gold medals and two bronze medals at the Summer Paralympics.

At the 1980 Summer Paralympics, she won the gold medal in the women's high jump A event. At the 1984 Summer Paralympics, she won the gold medal in the women's long jump B1 and bronze medals in the women's high jump B1 and women's 100 metres B1 events. At the 1988 Summer Paralympics in Seoul, South Korea, she won the gold medal in the women's long jump B1 event.

The Joke van Rijswijk Award is named after her. The award is given to people or organisations that have made contributions to sports for people with disabilities.

References

External links 
 

1954 births
Living people
Place of birth missing (living people)
Paralympic gold medalists for the Netherlands
Paralympic bronze medalists for the Netherlands
Paralympic medalists in athletics (track and field)
Athletes (track and field) at the 1980 Summer Paralympics
Athletes (track and field) at the 1984 Summer Paralympics
Athletes (track and field) at the 1988 Summer Paralympics
Medalists at the 1980 Summer Paralympics
Medalists at the 1984 Summer Paralympics
Medalists at the 1988 Summer Paralympics
Paralympic athletes of the Netherlands
Dutch female sprinters
Dutch female high jumpers
Dutch female long jumpers
Visually impaired sprinters
Visually impaired high jumpers
Visually impaired long jumpers
Paralympic sprinters
Paralympic high jumpers
Paralympic long jumpers
20th-century Dutch women
20th-century Dutch people
21st-century Dutch women